Fred “Arkansas” Lee Barnett (born June 17, 1966 in Gunnison, Mississippi) is an American former professional football player who was a wide receiver in the National Football League (NFL) for the Philadelphia Eagles and Miami Dolphins.  He played college football at Arkansas State University and was selected by the Eagles in the third round of the 1990 NFL Draft.

Barnett played in eight NFL seasons from 1990 to 1997 for the Eagles and the Dolphins. He made the Pro Bowl following the 1992 season and was known for his ability to make acrobatic catches.  He was the receiver on one of the Eagles' longest plays of all time, a 95-yard touchdown pass from Randall Cunningham in a 1990 game against the Buffalo Bills. Barnett was later the tight ends coach of the Memphis Maniax of the XFL.

Barnett's cousin Tim Barnett played the same position, WR, with the Kansas City Chiefs.

References

1966 births
Living people
People from Bolivar County, Mississippi
Players of American football from Mississippi
American football wide receivers
Arkansas State Red Wolves football players
Philadelphia Eagles players
Miami Dolphins players
National Conference Pro Bowl players
Memphis Maniax coaches
Ed Block Courage Award recipients